La Maison Francaise may refer to the following buildings:

 Buell Hall, a building at Columbia University
 La Maison Française (Nazareth College)
 La Maison Française (New York University)
 La Maison Francaise (Rockefeller Center)

See also 
 Maison française d'Oxford, England